The Corvette 31 is a Canadian sailboat, which was designed by C&C Design in 1965. The type is named in honour of the Corvette warship class.

Production
The boat was built by C&C Yachts at their Belleville Marine Yard (Morch Marine) in Belleville, Ontario Canada. Between the start of production in 1966 and production end in 1971. Some sources claim a total of 171 examples were completed, while others say 167.

In production year 1968/69, 41 examples were completed and in 1969/70 production peaked at 52 completed. Productions plans for another 52 to be built in 1970/71 were cancelled when the Belleville facility was closed and production ended.

The design sold well in its home waters of the Bay of Quinte and also in Montreal and the Chesapeake Bay region of the United States. The initial price in 1966 was $12,500.

Design

The Corvette was designed to a Cruising Club of America Southern Ocean Racing Conference (S.O.R.C.) rule that resulted in boats with a heavy displacement and a shoal draft. The design was named the corvette by Ian Morch, owner of Morch Marine, in honour of the Second World War Flower-class corvettes operated by the Royal Canadian Navy on convoy escort duty.

The Corvette 31 is a small recreational sailboat, built predominantly of fiberglass, with wood trim. It has a masthead sloop rig, a keel mounted rudder on a fixed long keel, with a retractable centreboard. It displaces  and carries  of ballast.

The boat was factory-equipped with a Universal Atomic 4 gasoline engine, although some were subsequently owner-equipped with diesel engines.

The Corvette Sailboat Association describes the design:

Operational history

In the first race it was entered in, the 1968 Lipton Cup Race held in the Atlantic waters off Miami, Florida, a Corvette 31 named Elektra II, crewed by builder Ian Morch as skipper, designer George Cuthberston, George Hinterhoeller, and Laser designer Bruce Kirby, finished first in the Class D and 24th overall out of a fleet of more than 100 boats.

In the 1968 Miami-Nassau race of  Elektra II finished second in Class D and second overall.

In a review Michael McGoldrick wrote, "The Corvette 31 was designed in 1965 and most were built in the late 1960s. This is one of the boats that helped establish C&C as a household name in the Canadian boating industry. These boats have a graceful traditional look about them, and they continue to enjoy a loyal following. The Corvette has a retractable keel incorporated into its full keel. With the swing keel all the way up, the Corvette only draws 3'3" (1m), making it an excellent boat for shallow water areas. It has a very livable interior, but it is a little small when compared to later designs... It is interesting to note that this boat was named after the Canadian navy's Corvette which became famous for providing convoy escort in the North Atlantic during World War II."

See also

List of sailing boat types

Related development
Frigate 36

Similar sailboats
Allmand 31
B-Boats B-32
Beneteau 31
Catalina 310
Herreshoff 31
Hunter 31
Hunter 31-2
Hunter 32
Hunter 310
Hunter 320
J/32
Marlow-Hunter 31
Niagara 31
Roue 20

References

External links

Keelboats
1960s sailboat type designs
Sailing yachts
Sailboat type designs by C&C Design
Sailboat types built by C&C Yachts